Publius Sulpicius Quirinius (c. 51 BC – AD 21), also translated as Cyrenius, was a Roman aristocrat. After the banishment of the ethnarch Herod Archelaus from the tetrarchy of Judea in AD 6, Quirinius was appointed legate governor of Syria, to which the province of Judaea had been added for the purpose of a census.

Life
Born into an undistinguished family, son of Publius Sulpicius Quirinus and paternal grandson of Publius Sulpicius Quirinius, from Gens Sulpicia, in the neighbourhood of Lanuvium, a Latin town near Rome, Quirinius followed the normal pathway of service for an ambitious young man of his social class. According to the Roman historian Florus, Quirinius defeated the Marmaridae, a tribe of desert raiders from Cyrenaica, possibly while governor of Crete and Cyrene around 14 BC, but nonetheless declined the honorific name "Marmaricus".  In 12 BC he was named consul, a sign that he enjoyed the favour of Augustus.

From 12 to 1 BC, he led a campaign against the Homanades (Homonadenses), a tribe based in the mountainous region of Galatia and Cilicia, around 5–3 BC, probably as legate of Galatia. He won the campaign by reducing their strongholds and starving out the defenders. For this victory, he was awarded a triumph and elected duumvir by the colony of Antioch of Pisidia.

By 1 AD, Quirinius was appointed tutor to Augustus' grandson Gaius Caesar, until the latter died from wounds suffered on campaign. When Augustus' support shifted to his stepson Tiberius, Quirinius changed his allegiance to the latter. Having been married to Claudia Appia, about whom little is known, he divorced her and around 3 AD married Aemilia Lepida, daughter of Quintus Aemilius Lepidus and sister of Manius Aemilius Lepidus, who had originally been betrothed to Lucius Caesar. Within a few years they were divorced: in 20 AD he accused her of claiming that he was her son's father, and later of trying to poison him during their marriage. Tacitus claims that she was popular with the public, who regarded Quirinius as carrying on a prosecution out of spite.

After the banishment of the ethnarch Herod Archelaus in 6 AD, Judaea (the conglomeration of Samaria, Judea and Idumea) came under direct Roman administration, with Coponius appointed as prefect. At the same time, Quirinius was appointed Legate of Syria, with instructions to assess Judea Province for taxation purposes. One of his first duties was to carry out a census as part of this order.

The Jews already hated their pagan conquerors, and censuses were forbidden under Jewish law. The assessment was greatly resented by the Jews, and open revolt was prevented only by the efforts of the high priest Joazar. Despite efforts to prevent revolt, the census did trigger the revolt of Judas of Galilee and the formation of the party of the Zealots, according to Josephus and of which Luke speaks in the Acts of the Apostles.

There is a reference to Quirinius in the Gospel of Luke chapter 2, which – in certain translations – links the birth of Jesus to the time of the Census of Quirinius, although this contradicts the time of Jesus' birth given in the Gospel of Matthew, that is, ten years earlier, under the reign of Herod the Great, who died in the year 4 BC.
Even more confusing is that this contradicts Luke 1.5 where Herod the Great, who died in 4BC, is clearly still alive within a year of Jesus's birth. It is unlikely therefore that whatever Luke means in Luke 2.2 that he is asserting Jesus's birth occurred in 6-8 AD. 
Quirinius served as governor of Syria with authority over Judaea until 12 AD, when he returned to Rome as a close associate of Tiberius.  Nine years later he died and was given a public funeral.

Archaeology
The earliest known mention of his name is in an inscription from 12 BC discovered in Antioch Pisidia known as Res Gestae Divi Augusti ('The Deeds of the Divine Augustus'), which states: "A great crowd of people came together from all over Italy to my election, ... when Publius Sulpicius (Quirinius) and Gaius Valgius were consuls." Two other inscriptions also found in Pisidian Antioch (Inscriptiones Latinae Selectae 9502–9503) mentioned Quirinius as a Duumvir, when Marcus Servilius was a Roman consul in 3 AD.

The discovery of coins issued by Quirinius as governor of Syria, bearing the date "the 36th year of Caesar [Augustus]" (5/6 AD counted from the Battle of Actium) confirmed his position there. The census that he conducted in Syria has been confirmed by an inscription purchased in Beirut in 1674 and brought to Venice, commemorating a Roman officer who had served under him stating among other achievements: "By order of the same Quirinius I took a census of the city of Apamea".

Historical accounts
The Roman historian Tacitus wrote in his Annals Book III that when Quirinius died in 21 AD, Tiberius Caesar "requested that the Senate pay tribute...with a public funeral", and described him as a "tireless soldier, who had by his faithful services become consul during the reign of Augustus, ... [and] later was appointed to be an adviser to Caius Caesar in the government of Armenia..." The Jewish historian Josephus wrote in more detail about the census of Judea around 6 AD that Quirinius undertook as the governor of Syria.

See also
Sulpicia (gens)
Census of Quirinius
List of biblical figures identified in extra-biblical sources

Notes

Bibliography

External links
Livius.org: Publius Sulpicius Quirinius
Jewish Encyclopedia: QUIRINIUS, P. SULPICIUS
Josephus Jewish Antiquities 18

51 BC births
21 deaths
1st-century Roman governors of Syria
People from Lanuvio
Sulpicii
1st-century BC Romans
1st-century Romans
Roman governors of Crete and Cyrenaica
Imperial Roman consuls
Roman governors of Galatia
Roman governors of Syria
People in the canonical gospels
Census of Quirinius